Jeff Schebler is an American football player who set the NCAA all-time scoring record for a kicker while playing for University of Wisconsin-Whitewater.  Nicknamed the "Golden Boot" on campus, Schebler compiled 470 points from 2006 to 2009.

References

Year of birth missing (living people)
Living people
American football placekickers
Wisconsin–Whitewater Warhawks football players